Daeryun High School (대륜고등학교 大倫高等學校) is a public high school situated in Suseong-gu, Daegu, South Korea. Daeryun High School was established on September 15, 1921, and its motto is Don't deceive oneself, love others.

History 
The school, originally called Kyonam Hakwon (Korean: 교남학원), was founded by three men in the Korean independence movement: Hong Ju-Il (Korean: 홍주일), Kim Youngseo (Korean:김영서), and  Jeong Ungi (Korean: 정운기) on September 15, 1921. The name of the school was changed to Daeryun School (Korean: 대륜학교) in October 1940, and the school moved to its current location in December 1988. The school is planning to celebrate its hundredth anniversary on September 15, 2021, by constructing a historical museum of Daeryun.

Notable alumni 
 Yi Sang-hwa
 Yi Yuksa
 Lee Sang-jeong

References

External links 
 Daeryun High School official site (in Korean)

Educational institutions established in 1921
High schools in Daegu
1921 establishments in Korea
Boys' schools in South Korea